Aboubacar Tandia (born 3 October 1983) is a French former professional footballer who played as a striker.

Career
Tandia played for Red Star 93, US Roye, Pau FC, and AS Beauvais Oise.

After trialling with US Sénart-Moissy, he joined the club in October 2011.

References

1983 births
Living people
French sportspeople of Senegalese descent
Association football forwards
French footballers
Footballers from Paris
Championnat National players
Championnat National 2 players
Primeira Liga players
Red Star F.C. players
US Roye-Noyon players
Pau FC players
AS Beauvais Oise players
Villemomble Sports players
Associação Naval 1º de Maio players
US Sénart-Moissy players
FCM Aubervilliers players
French expatriate footballers
French expatriate sportspeople in Portugal
Expatriate footballers in Portugal